Ubon Ratchathani Main Line or Lower Isan Line is a railway line in Thailand. It runs from Ban Phachi Junction in the central to Ubon Ratchathani railway station in the lower northeastern, passes many provinces.

History

Timeline

Name changes

Notable railway stations

 Saraburi Station - Provincial station, Pak Priaw station until 1934.
 Kaeng Khoi Junction - The Bua Yai Line and Khlong Sip Kao line diverge from the mainline here. Main Depot with refueling facility.  The point for dividing freight trains into two trains to pass difficult section of Dong Phraya Yen (Kaeng Khoi - Pak Chong) or combining divided freight trains back into one train
 Pak Chong Station - The gateway to Nakhon Ratchasima and the point for dividing freight trains into two to pass difficult section of Dong Phraya Yen (Kaeng Khoi - Pak Chong) or combining divided freight trains back into one train
 Nakhon Ratchasima Station - Main depot of the Northeastern Line with refueling facility and a branch line to 2nd Army Support Command.
 Thanon Chira Junction - Junction for Nong Khai line close to Fort Suranaree (2nd Army Region HQ)
 Buri Ram Station - provincial station with a branch line to a quarry at Khao Kradong
 Surin Station - provincial station
 Si Sa Ket Station - provincial station
 Ubon Ratchathani Station in town of Warin Chamrap - Terminus of South Isaan Line (also known as Ubon Line) with Depot and refueling facility.  Varindr station until 1942–1943.

References

Railway lines in Thailand
Railway lines opened in 1896
Metre gauge railways in Thailand